Ambrose Arthur Samson (14 October 1897 – 1980) was an English professional footballer who played in the Football League for Birmingham. He played as a goalkeeper.

Samson was born in Measham, Leicestershire, and began his football career with Measham Town before joining Birmingham in 1922. He made his debut in the First Division on 3 March 1923, deputising for Dan Tremelling in a game at Preston North End which Birmingham won 3–2. Tremelling's form restricted Samson to two appearances that season, at the end of which he returned to non-league football with Burton Town.

The 1939 Register lists Samson as living with his wife, Elsie, in Ashby-de-la-Zouch, Leicestershire, and working as a colliery winding engineer. He died in 1980 in Coalville, Leicestershire, at the age of 82.

References

1897 births
1980 deaths
People from Measham
Footballers from Leicestershire
English footballers
Association football goalkeepers
Measham Town F.C. players
Birmingham City F.C. players
Burton Town F.C. players
English Football League players
Date of death missing